Coldvreath is a hamlet south-southwest of Roche in Cornwall, England. It is in the civil parish of Roche.

References

Hamlets in Cornwall